The following is a list of notable University of Music and Performing Arts Vienna alumni.

Notable alumni

Conductors
Alexander Alexeev
Philippe Auguin
Claudio Abbado
Alan Buribayev
Donald Covert
James Erb
James Allen Gähres
Nikolaus Harnoncourt
Jascha Horenstein
Mariss Jansons
Herbert von Karajan
Clemens Krauss
Uroš Lajovic
Jesús López Cobos
Gustav Mahler
Zubin Mehta
Felix Mottl
Arthur Nikisch
Andrés Orozco-Estrada
Erwin Ortner
Kirill Petrenko
Johannes Wildner
Hans Richter
Georg Tintner
Josep Caballé Domenech
Mario Venzago
Oliver von Dohnányi
Karel Mark Chichon
Manfred Honeck
Walter Weller
Alexander Rahbari
Shardad Rohani

Composers
Miguel del Águila
Nicolae Bretan
Friedrich Cerha
George Enescu
Marios Joannou Elia
Iván Erőd
Beat Furrer
Karl Goldmark
Róbert Gulya
Georg Friedrich Haas
Paul Haslinger
Leoš Janáček
Gustav Mahler
Alireza Mashayekhi
Ahmad Pejman
Ezio Bosso
Thomas Larcher
Hans Rott
Kurt Schwertsik
Jean Sibelius
Mauricio Sotelo
Ferdi Statzer
Johannes Maria Staud
Mimi Wagensonner
Norma Wendelburg
Hugo Wolf
Alexander von Zemlinsky

Pianists and organists
Miguel del Águila
Khatia Buniatishvili
Rudolf Buchbinder
Helmut Deutsch
Matthias Fletzberger
Friedrich Gulda
Mitsuko Uchida
Maciej Łukaszczyk
Christiana Lin
Wayne Marshall
Peter Planyavsky
Wolfgang Sauseng
Paul Weingarten
Erik Werba

String players
Christoph Koncz
Joseph Joachim
Oskar Back
Johanna Beisteiner
Carl Flesch
Gareth Koch
Leon Koudelak
Fritz Kreisler
Johannes Wildner
Heinrich Schiff
Günter Pichler
Joji Hattori
Manfred Honeck
Ludwig Streicher
Walter Weller
Friedrich Buxbaum
Georg Hellmesberger Sr.
Ricardo Odnoposoff
Arnold Rosé
Rainer Küchl
Shkelzen Doli

Wind, brass, and percussion
Thomas Gansch
Johann Hindler
Ernst Ottensamer
Carole Dawn Reinhart

Singers
Mimi Coertse
Kieth Engen
Antonia Fahberg
Anny Felbermayer
Marie Fillunger
Aida Garifullina
Ernst Gutstein
Wolfgang Holzmair
Angelika Kirchschlager
Gabrielle Krauss
Genia Kühmeier
Elisabeth Kulman
Kari Løvaas
Aga Mikolaj
Lula Mysz-Gmeiner
Cristina Pasaroiu
Kurt Rydl
Andreas Schager
Michael Spyres
Linda Watson (soprano)

Film and theatre
Barbara Albert
Achim Benning
Katharina Mückstein
Max Steiner
Robert O. Ragland
Sophie Rois
Ulrich Seidl
Christoph Waltz

Other
Stephanie Goldner
Susana Naidich
Leopold Nowak
Heinrich Schenker
Elisabeth Wärnfeldt
Josef Venantius von Wöss

References

University of Music and Performing Arts Vienna alumni
University of Music and Performing Arts Vienna